Planner is a free personal information manager for Emacs written in Emacs Lisp.

Mode
It helps keep track of schedules, daily notes, days to remember etc. and takes advantage of the ease of keyboard shortcuts that Emacs provides for fast access to all data. One of the main advantages of Planner is that it stores all data as hyperlinked plain text files which enables users to use planner data in a variety of ways. One of them is publishing your planner data to an HTML page.

Planner was originally written by John Wiegley, who wrote many other extensions during the years, including Alert, a Growl-style workalike system for Emacs. Planner was very popular within the Emacs community at first, but has been surpassed by the org-mode package with time.

Planner is released under the GPL-3.0-or-later license.

References

External links 
 PlannerMode page on EmacsWiki

Emacs
Free personal information managers
Emacs modes